Daniel Angelocrator (1569 – 1635), real surname Engelhardt, was a German Reformed minister.

Life
He was born on 19 October 1569 in Korbach. He studied theology at the University of Marburg and University of Franeker from 1588 to 1589. Angelocrater then took a job accompanying two young aristocrats to the Universities of Marburg and Helmstedt. In 1594 he clashed with his father over his Calvinism, moved to Geneva and stayed with a former pupil.

Angelocrater then was employed in the High School of Stade. From 1597 to 1606 he was a prominent minister in Hesse-Kassel, in various cities. Maurice, Landgrave of Hesse-Kassel in 1607 made him Archdeacon of Marburg, and 1614 the Superintendent. He was one of the delegates to the Synod of Dort in 1618.

In the Thirty Years' War the neighbouring Lutheran state of Hesse-Darmstadt was opposed to Hesse-Kassel, and in 1624 Angelocrator had to leave to escape its troops.  As minister of Gudensberg, and supervising Obervorschütz, he then lost everything in 1626 to the pillaging Imperial troops of Johann Tserclaes, Count of Tilly. He was appointed to the consistory at Kassel, and then went in 1627 to Köthen, where he died on 30 July 1635.

Works
He is known, as well as a minister, as a chronologist for his Chronologia Autoptica (1601), which placed reliance on the works of the forger Annius of Viterbo, and cartographer for a map in his Doctrina de ponderibus, monetis, et mensuris.

References
:de:s:ADB:Angelocrator, Daniel

Notes

External links
WorldCat page
Open Library page
CERL page

1569 births
1635 deaths
German Calvinist and Reformed ministers
Participants in the Synod of Dort
German cartographers
Chronologists
University of Marburg alumni
University of Franeker alumni
People from Korbach